Skara is a locality and the seat of Skara Municipality, Västra Götaland County, Sweden with 18,580 inhabitants in 2013. Despite its small size, it is one of the oldest cities in Sweden, and has a long educational and ecclesiastical history. One of Sweden's oldest high schools, Katedralskolan (cathedral school), is situated in Skara. The former county of Skaraborg was named after a fortress near the town.

Geography

Climate
Skara has a humid continental climate, though it is influenced by maritime moderation in spite of its inland position. Its proximity to Kattegat and lake Vänern contributes to summers being slightly cooler than areas to the north-east, and winter temperatures mostly hover around the freezing point.

History
According to local legend, Skara was founded in AD 988, making it one of the oldest cities of Sweden.  It was one of only two cities in what was to become Västergötland, the other being Lödöse.  Skara was the location for the regional assembly, the Thing of all Geats.

With the Christianization of Sweden, around 1000 AD, Skara became the seat for the bishop and a religious centre for the ensuing centuries.  There have been bishops of Skara in an unbroken succession to this day.

Many important assemblies were held in Skara in medieval times.  Examples include the important Swedish chancellor meeting in 1326.  A meeting of Swedish, Danish and Norwegians in 1458, decided upon the later Kalmar Union.

In the ensuing medieval centuries, monasteries and other churches were completed in the town.  The first monastery was for the Dominican order, called the monastery of Saint Olaf, opened in 1234; the other was of the Franciscan order, known as Saint Catherine (or Katarina in Swedish), recorded in 1259.

The foundations of the Skara Cathedral are believed to stem from around 1050. The current cathedral was inaugurated in 1150, but findings during the last 50 years show it must be at least a century older.  Its current appearance, however, stems from renovations in the 1880s by Helgo Zettervall, who also renovated the Cathedral of Uppsala.

Middle ages
Medieval artifacts have been found in or near the Skara cathedral.  A chalice from bishop Adalvard the Elder, dead in 1064, was found in his grave in the 18th century.  For a while the  Adalvardskalken was used in the Holy Communion.

Some 44 pages of a book containing texts and hymns of 11th-century Catholic rituals, the Skara Missal, is held and exhibited in Skara.

Other ancient objects have been found during excavations of the monasteries and churches.

Education
There is a branch of the Swedish University of Agricultural Sciences (Sveriges Lantbruksuniversitet) in Skara.

Culture and attractions
In the city centre, near the main square, is the imposing Skara Cathedral. Within walking distance from the Cathedral is the Museum of Västergötland and its adjacent open-air museum Fornbyn, featuring several old cottages and other historical buildings from the local area.

In early spring, several thousand cranes gather in and around Lake Hornborga, on their yearly migration from the south of Europe to northern Scandinavia. This is a very popular tourist attraction during a few hectic weeks in March/April.

Within the municipality but outside of the city is Varnhem, home to a medieval Cistercian abbey and the remains of possibly the oldest Christian church in Sweden. Just outside the abbey are the ruins of the Cistercian monastery, built around 1150 A.D.

There are several music and entertainment artists in Skara, giving it a notable spot among the cities. The Skara Sommarland is a popular amusement park with a reputation well known throughout the nation.  Most notable is its water park with water chutes, artificial rafts, etc.

The official museum of Västergötland is in Skara. There is also a railway museum called Järnvägs.

Sister cities
Skara is twinned with:

  Radviliškis, Lithuania
  Eidsvoll, Norway
  Sorø, Denmark
  Fljótsdalshérað, Iceland
  Zeven, Germany

See also
 Diocese of Skara
 Norra Härene Runestone

References 
 Nordisk Familjebok, see link below.

External links

 Skara Tourist Office
 Skara - Official site
 Skara - Marketing Agency
  Skara, in Nordisk familjebok (in Swedish)

Populated places in Västra Götaland County
Populated places in Skara Municipality
Municipal seats of Västra Götaland County
Swedish municipal seats
Skaraborg
Viking Age populated places

fi:Skaran kunta